Anthony Carrigan may refer to:
Anthony Carrigan (actor) (born 1983), American actor
Anthony Carrigan (academic) (1980–2016), British academic